Events from the year 1894 in Brazil.

Incumbents

Federal government 
 President: Marshal Floriano Peixoto (until 14 November), Prudente de Morais (starting 15 November)
 Vice-President: Vacant (until 14 November), Manuel Vitorino (starting 15 November)

Governors 
 Alagoas: 
 until 16 June: Gabino Besuoro
 16 June-17 July: Provisional Government
 17 July-17 October: Tiburcio Valeriano da Rocha Lima
 starting 17 October: Manuel Gomes Ribeiro
 Amazonas: Eduardo Gonçalves Ribeiro
 Bahia: Rodrigues Lima
 Ceará: Antônio Nogueira Accioli
 Goiás: José Inácio Xavier de Brito
 Maranhão: Casimiro Vieira Jr
 Mato Grosso: 
 until 7 September: Afonso Pena
 from 7 September: Bias Fortes
 Minas Gerais: 
 Pará: Lauro Sodré
 Paraíba: Álvaro Lopes Machado
 Paraná: Vicente Machado da Silva Lima, then Teófilo Soares Gomes, then João Meneses Dória, then Francisco José Cardoso Júnior, then Tertuliano Teixeira de Freitas, then Antônio José Ferreira Braga, then Vicente Machado da Silva Lima, then Francisco Xavier da Silva
 Pernambuco: Alexandre José Barbosa Lima
 Piauí: Coriolano de Carvalho e Silva
 Rio Grande do Norte: Pedro de Albuquerque Maranhão
 Rio Grande do Sul: 
 until 25 January: Fernando Fernandes Abbott
 from 25 January: Júlio Prates de Castilhos
 Santa Catarina:
 São Paulo: 
 Sergipe:

Vice governors 
 Rio de Janeiro: 
 Rio Grande do Norte:
 São Paulo:

Events
January - Rio de Janeiro Affair: a series of incidents during the Brazilian Naval Revolt.
March 1 - Brazilian presidential election, 1894
June 27 - Federalist Revolution: Battle of Passo Fundo in the state of Rio Grande do Sul
November 15 - Inauguration of Prudente de Morais as president.

Births
January 4 - Manuel de Abreu, physician, scientist and inventor (died 1962)
February 15 - Osvaldo Aranha, politician and diplomat (died 1960)
November 5 - Djalma Guimarães, geochemist (died 1973)

Deaths
February 9 - Gomes Carneiro, army officer (born 1846)
November 24 - Pardal Mallet, novelist and journalist (born 1864; tuberculosis)

References

 
1890s in Brazil
Years of the 19th century in Brazil
Brazil
Brazil